Filip Prpic (born 26 May 1982 in Helsingborg, Sweden) is a former professional Swedish player of Croatian descent on the Association of Tennis Professionals (ATP) Tour. Prpic's career-high ranking was World Number 194, which he achieved on 1 May 2006.

ATP Challenger and ITF Futures finals

Singles: 13 (9–4)

Doubles: 11 (6–5)

Performance timeline

Singles

External links

 

1982 births
Living people
Sportspeople from Helsingborg
Swedish male tennis players
Swedish people of Croatian descent